The Orouba Language School is an Egyptian school located at Maadi and Dokki. It was established in Dokki in 1960 and in Maadi in 1985, and offers schooling from preschool through all twelve grades. The institution is equipped with gymnasia, athletic fields, a computer lab, and a library.

References

External links
Orouba Schools Website

Schools in Cairo
Educational institutions established in 1960
1960 establishments in Egypt